Epermenia strictellus is a moth of the  family Epermeniidae. It is found in Europe (from the Iberian Peninsula to Poland, Romania and the Balkan Peninsula), as well as in North Africa, from Turkey, through Kyrgyzstan and the Tuva Region to Japan.

The wingspan is 11–17 mm. The forewings are ochreous-cream, scattered with blackish-grey scales. The hindwings are greyish-fuscous.

The larvae feed on Pimpinella saxifraga, Ferula communis, Laserpitium species, as well as on the flowers and unripe fruits of Seseli arenarium. The species overwinters as an adult.

References

Moths described in 1867
Epermeniidae
Moths of Japan
Moths of Europe
Moths of Africa
Moths of Asia